Rosé is a style of wine.

Rosé may also refer to:

Music

 Rosé (album), an album by Bran Van 3000
 "Rosé" (song), a song by the Feeling
 Rosé Quartet, a string quartet formed by Arnold Rosé in 1882

People
 Rosé (singer) (born 1997), South Korean-New Zealand singer
 Rosé (drag queen) (born 1989), Scottish-American drag queen
 Rosé (surname), includes a list of people with the surname Rosé

Fictional
 Rosé Thomas, a character of Fullmetal Alchemist
 Super Saiyan Rosé, a transformation used by Goku Black in Dragon Ball Super

See also 
 Rose (disambiguation)